The 2018 Central American and Caribbean Games football tournament was the 21st edition of the competition at the 21st edition of the Central American and Caribbean Games.

Colombia won the gold in the men's tournament, while Mexico won the gold in the women's tournament.

Men's event

Although the competition is considered to be an under-21 age group competition, up to three players born before 1 January 1997 may be named in the squad. Each participating national football association will select a final squad of 20 players.

Group stage

Group A

Group B

Knockout stage

Women's event

There are no age restrictions. Each participating national football association will select a final squad of 20 players.

Group stage

Group A

Group B

Knockout stage

Medal table

References

External links
2018 Central American and Caribbean Games – Football

 
2018
2018 Central American and Caribbean Games events
2018–19 in CONCACAF football
International association football competitions hosted by Colombia